Anti-LGBT rhetoric comprises themes, catchphrases, and slogans that have been used in order to demean lesbian, gay, bisexual, and transgender (LGBT) people. They range from the demeaning and the pejorative to expressions of hostility towards homosexuality which are based on religious, medical, or moral grounds. It is a form of hate speech, which is illegal in countries such as the Netherlands, Norway, and Sweden.

Anti-LGBT rhetoric often consists of moral panic and conspiracy theories. In Eastern Europe, these conspiracy theories are based on earlier antisemitic conspiracy theories and posit that the LGBT movement is an instrument of foreign control and domination.

As a foreign conspiracy 

In 1969, the Greek junta exited the Council of Europe after being found in violation of the European Convention of Human Rights, judging that the European Commission of Human Rights was "a conspiracy of homosexuals and communists against Hellenic values".

This discourse, promoted by the governments of Hungary and Poland, alleges that LGBT rights movements are controlled by foreign forces (such as the European Union) and are a threat to national independence and western civilization. Anti-government protests in Russia and the Euromaidan have also been portrayed by the Russian government as the work of an LGBT conspiracy. Furthermore, although Russia considers itself to be a European country, its values are entirely different from those commonly seen within the European Union. More specifically, Russia used to protest against the common European Values in support of LGBT rights, however  rather than complaining about these values, Russia has now chosen to openly express their own values, which are entirely against any support for LGBT rights.

As an ideology 

In 2013, Alex Aradanas published some articles in the right-wing website American Thinker which discussed "LGBT ideology", for instance, "to affirm LGBT ideology is to support abuse". The Italian Catholic philosopher  also used the phrase in a 2015 article, equating it with the earlier concept of "gender ideology". In his article he does not define either "LGBT ideology" or "gender ideology". In 2017, several conservative Islamic politicians in Malaysia and Indonesia attacked "LGBT ideology".

During a sermon on 1 August 2019, Polish Archbishop Marek Jędraszewski called "LGBT ideology" a "rainbow plague" and compared it to the "Red Plague" of Communism. Following this, the Czech cardinal Dominik Duka also commented on "LGBT ideology". However, because Czech society is secular and the Catholic Church has little influence on Czech politics, his comments had little impact. In September 2019, Stanley Bill, a lecturer at Cambridge University who studies Poland, stated "Scaremongering about 'LGBT ideology' has almost become official policy in Poland with often nasty insinuations from members of the government and public media now the norm".

In June 2020, Polish President Andrzej Duda drew international attention when he called LGBT an "ideology" and a form of "Neo-Bolshevism". Agreement Party MP Jacek Żalek stated in an interview that the LGBT community "are not people" and "it's an ideology", which led to the journalist  asking him to leave the studio; the row caused controversy. The next day, Duda said at a rally in Silesia: "They are trying to convince us that [LGBT] is people, but it is just an ideology." He promised to "ban the propagation of LGBT ideology in public institutions", including schools, similar to the Russian gay propaganda law. On the same day, PiS MP Przemysław Czarnek said on a TVP Info talk show, regarding a photo of a naked person in a gay bar, "Let's defend ourselves against LGBT ideology and stop listening to those idiocies about human rights or equality. These people are not equal to normal people."

In July 2020, the European Union announced that it will not provide funding to six Polish towns that have declared themselves "LGBT-free zones", after nearly 100 local governments, a third of Poland's territory, declared themselves "free from LGBT ideology." On 1 August 2020, the anniversary of the Warsaw Uprising, ultranationalist Robert Winnicki compared LGBT to communist and Nazi ideology. He stated, "Every plague passes at some point. The German plague passed, which was consuming Poland for six years, the red plague passed, the rainbow plague is also going to pass." In August 2020, Justice Minister Zbigniew Ziobro announced a new program for "counteracting crimes related to the violation of freedom of conscience committed under the influence of LGBT ideology". From a government fund intended to help victims of crime, PLN 613,698 was awarded to a foundation to combat the alleged crimes of "LGBT ideology". The project, among other things, explores a supposed connection between LGBT ideology and the Frankfurt School. At the 16 August "Stop LGBT aggression" rally that year, Krzysztof Bosak said that even irreligious people are among opponents of "LGBT ideology" because it is "contrary to common sense and rational thinking". He also said that the LGBT community is "a lower form of social life".

Criticism 
According to Krakow Post, a Polish newspaper, "LGBT is not an ideology... The phrase 'LGBT ideology' makes about as much sense as 'redhead ideology' or 'left-handed ideology.'" While the support of many LGBT people and their allies improved LGBT rights, they have differing political views. According to Notes from Poland, "attacks on 'LGBT ideology' – which often rely on exaggerated, distorted or invented claims – result in the marginalisation and demonisation of such people." Center-right presidential candidate Szymon Hołownia, who is a practicing Catholic, stated, "there is no such thing as LGBT ideology, there are [LGBT] people". He said that anti-LGBT rhetoric from politicians could lead vulnerable people to suicide. In protest at the comments made by the president and Żalek, LGBT people have held pickets in various towns and cities in Poland, opposing the idea that LGBT is an ideology. Activists also created a film, "Ludzie, nie ideologia" (People, not ideology) showcasing the families of LGBT people.

An article in OKO.press compared the anti-LGBT campaign to the 1968 "anti-Zionist" campaign: during the anti-Zionist campaign, people said that they were targeting Zionism as an ideology, but ended up targeting Jews as people. Many Jews were forced out of the country in 1968, and LGBT people are emigrating from Poland in 2020. According to Polish historian Adam Leszczyński, "LGBT ideology" is

Dehumanization 

Dehumanization is a frequent feature of anti-LGBT rhetoric, which may take the form of comparing LGBT people to animals or equating homosexual relationships with bestiality.

Slurs 

According to one study, "homophobic epithets foster dehumanization and avoidance of gay people, in ways that other insults or labels do not." Another study found that homophobia "results in substantial health and welfare effects".

Calls for violence 

Anti-LGBT rhetoric also includes calls for violence against LGBT people and suggestions that they should be killed or die, such as in Cyprus, Iran, Russia, the United States, Malawi, or Uganda.

In Serbia, members of Obraz chanted "Death to faggots" and posted posters stating "we are waiting for you" next to an image of a baseball bat. In 2012, the organization was banned by the Constitutional Court of Serbia due to extremism.

Anti-gay themes 
Anti-gay activists claim that homosexuality goes against traditional family values, that homosexuality is a Trojan Horse, or that it destroys families and humankind through homosexual  which will lead to the extinction of humanity.

Homosexuality as a cause of disasters 
The argument that homosexuals cause natural disasters has been around for more than a thousand years, even before Justinian blamed earthquakes on "unchecked homosexual behavior" in the sixth century. This trope was common in early modern Christian literature; homosexuals were blamed for earthquakes, floods, famines, plagues, invasions of Saracens, and field mice. This discourse was revived by Anita Bryant in 1976 when she blamed homosexuals for droughts in California. In the U.S., right-wing religious groups including the Westboro Baptist Church continue to claim that homosexuals are responsible for disasters. Homosexuals have been blamed for hurricanes, including Isaac, Katrina, and Sandy. In 2020, various religious figures including Israeli rabbi Meir Mazuz have argued that the COVID-19 pandemic is divine retribution for same-sex activity or pride parades.

Following the September 2001 attacks, televangelist Jerry Falwell blamed "the pagans, and the abortionists, and the feminists, and the gays and the lesbians who are actively trying to make that an alternative lifestyle, the ACLU, People for the American Way" for provoking the aggression of Islamic fundamentalists and causing God to withdraw his protection for America. On the broadcast of the Christian television program The 700 Club, Falwell said, "You helped this happen". He later apologized and said, "I would never blame any human being except the terrorists".

In 2012, Chilean politician Ignacio Urrutia claimed that allowing homosexuals to serve in the Chilean military would cause Perú and Bolivia to invade and destroy his country.

AIDS as punishment 

An outgrowth of the discourse on homosexuality  argues that HIV/AIDS is divine punishment for homosexuality. During the early years of the AIDS epidemic in the 1980s, mainstream newspapers labeled it a "gay plague". For a few years, the misleading technical name for the disease was gay-related immune deficiency.

The slogan "AIDS Kills Fags Dead" (a pun on the commercial slogan for Raid insecticide "Raid Kills Bugs Dead") appeared during the early years of AIDS in the United States, when the disease was mainly diagnosed among male homosexuals and was almost invariably fatal. The slogan caught on quickly as a catchy truism, a chant, or simply something written as graffiti. It is reported that the slogan first appeared in public in the early 1990s, when Sebastian Bach, the former lead singer of the heavy metal band Skid Row, wore it on a t-shirt thrown to him by an audience member. The slogan "AIDS cures fags" is used by the Westboro Baptist Church.

Homosexuality as unnatural 

Describing homosexuality as unnatural dates back to Plato, Aristotle, and Thomas Aquinas. However, there is no single definition of "unnatural". Some of those who argue that homosexuality is unnatural in the sense of being absent from nature, an argument refuted by the presence of homosexuality in animals. Others mean that the genitals were created for reproduction (either by God or natural selection) and are not intended to be used for purposes they deem "unnatural". Proponents of this idea often argue that homosexuality is immoral because it is unnatural, but opponents argue that this argument makes an is–ought conflation. Some proponents of the "unnaturalness" thesis argue that homosexual behavior is the result of "" or willful sinfulness. However, if the causes of sexual orientation (still a matter of scientific debate) are biological, this undermines their argument to an extent.

Homosexuality as a disease 
Nazi propaganda described homosexuality as a contagious disease but not in the medical sense. According to Nazi ideology, individuals' lives were to be subordinated to the  like cells in the human body. Homosexuality was seen as a virus or cancer in the  because it was seen as a threat to the German nation. The SS newspaper  Das Schwarze Korps  argued that 40,000 homosexuals were capable of "poisoning" two million men if left to roam free.

Some of those who called homosexuality , such as Traditional Values Coalition head and Christian right activist Louis Sheldon, said that if it were proven to be a biologically based phenomenon, it would still be diseased. The psychiatric establishment in the west once medicalized same-sex desire. In the United States, homosexuality was removed in 1973 as a mental disorder from the Diagnostic and Statistical Manual of Mental Disorders (DSM) as it did not meet the criteria for a mental disorder. The Catholic Church still officially teaches that "homosexual tendencies" are "objectively disordered". In 2016, anti-LGBT rhetoric was increasing in Indonesia under the Twitter hashtag #TolakLGBT  (#RejectLGBT) and claims that LGBT is a disease. In 2019, Archbishop Marek Jędraszewski claimed that a "rainbow plague" is threatening Poland. In 2020, the education minister defended an official who warned that "LGBT virus" was threatening Polish schools, and was more dangerous than COVID-19.

Homosexuality as a choice or lifestyle 

Closely related to the idea of "homosexual recruitment" is the idea of a "gay lifestyle" or "homosexual lifestyle", which social and religious conservatives in the United States sometimes argue that lesbian, gay, and bisexual people have chosen voluntarily rather than having a non-heterosexual sexual orientation. 
However, people typically feel no sense of control over their sexual orientation or attractions, and biological explanations for sexual orientation are favoured by scientists.
The term "gay lifestyle" may also be used disparagingly for a series of stereotyped behaviours.

US media in the 1970s frequently used the term "alternative lifestyle" as a euphemism for homosexuality, and the term was employed in an anti-gay context by opponents of the Equal Rights Amendment, as well as supporters of California's Proposition 6, which would have barred openly gay teachers in public schools.
Christian right activists may worry that increasing LGBT rights will make the "gay lifestyle" more attractive to young people.
US president Ronald Reagan used the language of choice to portray the gay rights movement as being in opposition to American culture, saying the movement was "asking for a recognition and acceptance of an alternative lifestyle which I do not believe society can condone".

Homosexuality as sinful or ungodly 

Many conservative Christians consider homosexual acts to be inherently sinful based on scriptural passages such as Leviticus 18:22 ("You shall not lie with a male as with a woman; it is an abomination"), Leviticus 20:13 ("If a man lies with a male as with a woman, both of them have committed an abomination; they shall be put to death, their blood is upon them"), and 1 Corinthians 6:9–10 ("Do you not know that wrongdoers will not inherit the kingdom of God? Do not be deceived! Fornicators, idolaters, adulterers, male prostitutes, sodomites, thieves, the greedy, drunkards, revilers, robbers—none of these will inherit the kingdom of God.") The story of Sodom and Gomorrah, two biblical cities which were burned down due to the sins of its inhabitants, is sometimes portrayed as divine retribution for homosexual behavior.

Various inflammatory and controversial slogans, including some listed in the next section, have been used by opponent congregations and individuals, particularly by Fred Phelps, founder of the Westboro Baptist Church. These slogans have included "God Hates Fags", "Fear God Not Fags", and "Matthew Shepard Burns In Hell".

Homosexuality is also frequently considered sinful in Islam. In some Middle Eastern countries, acts of homosexuality are punishable by death. Anti-LGBT rhetoric and political homophobia are growing in some Muslim countries.

Other religious leaders including Christians, Muslims, and Jews have denounced anti-LGBT rhetoric.

The slogan "God made Adam and Eve, not Adam and Steve" alludes to a Bible-based argument that homosexuality is sinful and unnatural.
A Christianity Today article in December 1970 reported on attitudes in San Francisco, quoting a graffiti that said, "If God had wanted homosexuals, he would have created Adam and Freddy." In 1977, in Dade County, Anita Bryant made a similar comment, only her version was "Adam and Bruce". By 1979, Jerry Falwell had used "Adam and Steve". In 1977, it was used on a protest sign, as mentioned in a New York Times news service report about a November 19 rally in Houston that year. The phrase was used in "The Gay Bar", an episode of Maude broadcast on December 3, 1977. Two years later, Jerry Falwell gave the phrase wider circulation in a Christianity Today report of a press conference he had given. The phrase later acquired a certain notoriety, and, when used to name a pair of characters in a work of fiction, helps to identify them as members of a homosexual pair (Paul Rudnick's play The Most Fabulous Story Ever Told, the 2005 film Adam & Steve and other works). The phrase was used by the Democratic Unionist Party MP David Simpson during the 2013 British House of Commons' debate on same-sex marriage, although a slip of the tongue saying "in the Garden of Eden, it was Adam and Steve" initially caused laughter in the chamber. Zimbabwean presidential candidate Nelson Chamisa said in an interview that "[w]e must be able to respect what God ordained and how we are created as a people, there are a male and a female, there are Adam and Eve, not Adam and Steve". The phrase was also reclaimed by LGBT people and used in blogs, comics, and other media mocking the anti-gay message.

Homosexuality as a Western ill 

Homosexuality is sometimes claimed to be non-existent in some non-Western countries, or to be an evil influence imported from the West.

Prime Minister Mahathir Mohamad of Malaysia employed anti-gay rhetoric as part of his "Asian values" program, describing homosexuality as one of several Western ills.
Mohamad used it for political advantage in the 1998 scandal involving the sacking and jailing of MP and former Deputy Prime Minister Anwar Ibrahim by Mohamad amidst accusations of sodomy that the Sydney Morning Herald termed a "blatantly political fix-up". Anwar was subsequently subjected to two trials and sentenced to nine years imprisonment for corruption and sodomy.

While in New York for a meeting of the United Nations, Iranian President Mahmoud Ahmadinejad was invited to speak at Columbia University in New York to give a lecture.  When responding to a student question afterward, he said, speaking through an interpreter: "In Iran, we don't have homosexuals like in your country." In his native Farsi, he used the slang equivalent of faggot, not the neutral term for a "homosexual".

Other countries and regions viewing homosexuality as a Western disease include Vietnam, China, Ethiopia, Africa, Australian Muslims, and India.

Conflation with child abuse 

The claim that homosexuals sexually abuse children predates the current era, as it was leveled against pederasts even during antiquity. Lawmakers and social commentators have sometimes expressed a concern that normalizing homosexuality would also lead to normalizing pedophilia, if it were determined that pedophilia too were a sexual orientation. A related claim is that LGBT adoption is done for the purpose of grooming children for sexual exploitation. The empirical research shows that sexual orientation does not affect the likelihood that people will abuse children.

Others have made hoaxes intending to falsely associate pedophilia with the LGBT community by rebranding it as a sexual orientation, including claims that the "+" in "LGBT+" refers to "pedophiles, zoophiles, [and] necrophiles", as well as the invented terms "agefluid", "clovergender" (a hoax executed by users of the imageboard 4chan, whose logo is a stylized four-leaf clover), and "pedosexual".

Starting in 2022, some conservatives including Chaya Raichik of Libs of TikTok started using the terms "grooming", "groomer" and "pro-pedophile" against their opponents and LGBT people over anti-LGBT legislation, such as laws restricting and banning discussion of sexual orientation and gender identity in schools. Critics say that these usages of the terms diminish the experiences of sexual assault survivors, smear the LGBT community, and are dangerous in general.

"Gay agenda"

Recruitment 

The charge of "homosexual recruitment" is an allegation by social conservatives that LGBT people engage in concerted efforts to indoctrinate children into homosexuality. In the United States, this dates back to the early post-war era. Proponents were found especially among the New Right, as epitomized by Anita Bryant. In her Save Our Children campaign, she promoted a view of homosexuals recruiting youth. A common slogan is "Homosexuals cannot reproduce — so they must recruit" or its variants. Supporters of recruitment allegations point at "deviant" and "prurient" sex education as evidence. They express concern that anti-bullying efforts teach that "homosexuality is normal, and that students shouldn't harass their classmates because they're gay", suggesting recruitment as the primary motivation. Supporters of this myth cite the inability for same-sex couples to reproduce as a motivation for recruitment.

Sociologists and psychologists describe such claims as an anti-gay myth, and a fear-inducing bogeyman. Many critics believe the term promotes the myth of homosexuals as pedophiles .

 In 1977, Anita Bryant successfully campaigned to repeal an ordinance in Miami-Dade County that prohibited discrimination on the basis of sexual orientation. Her campaign was based upon allegations of homosexual recruitment. Writing about Bryant's efforts to repeal a Florida anti-discrimination law in the Journal of Social History, Michel Boucai wrote that "Bryant's organization, Save Our Children, framed the law as an endorsement of immorality and a license for 'recruitment'."
 Oregon's proposed 1992 Ballot Measure 9 contained language that would have added anti-LGBT rhetoric to the state Constitution. U.S. writer Judith Reisman justified her support for the measure, citing "a clear avenue for the recruitment of children" by gays and lesbians.
 A small newspaper in Uganda's capital attracted international attention in 2010 when it outed 100 gay people alongside a banner that said, "Hang them", and claimed that homosexuals aimed to "recruit" Ugandan children, and that schools had "been penetrated by gay activists to recruit kids." According to gay rights activists, many Ugandans were attacked afterward as a result of their real or perceived sexual orientation. Minorities activist David Kato, who was outed in the article and a co-plaintiff in the lawsuit against the paper, was subsequently murdered at home by an intruder and an international outcry resulted.
 In 1998, The Onion parodied the idea of "homosexual recruitment" in an article titled "'98 Homosexual-Recruitment Drive Nearing Goal", saying "Spokespersons for the National Gay & Lesbian Recruitment Task Force announced Monday that more than 288,000 straights have been converted to homosexuality since January 1, 1998, putting the group well on pace to reach its goal of 350,000 conversions by the end of the year." According to Mimi Marinucci, most US adults who support gay rights would recognize the story as satire due to unrealistic details. The Westboro Baptist Church passed along the story as fact, citing it as evidence of a gay conspiracy.

Homosexual conspiracies

"Homintern" 
In 1937, the English gay classics scholar Sir Maurice Bowra referred to himself as part of the "Homintern". However, there are competing claims about who coined the term – including Jocelyn Brooke, Harold Norse and W. H. Auden. A takeoff on "Comintern" (Communist International), it was meant to convey the idea of a global homosexual community.

Auden used the term in the Partisan Review in 1950, entitling his review of a book on Oscar Wilde: "A Playboy of the Western World: St. Oscar, the Homintern Martyr."

"Homintern" was also used by American Senator Joe McCarthy during the McCarthyist scare in the 1950s, who used it to claim that the administrations of Franklin D. Roosevelt and Harry S. Truman were set on destroying America from within. Attempts were made to link Communism and homosexuality, with "Homintern" a play on the word "Comintern" (the short name of the Communist International). But the word was also used ironically by those in favor of gay rights.

Homintern also appeared in a number of mass-circulation magazine articles during the 1960s – such as Ramparts, which in 1966 published an article by Gene Marine about the Homintern. It was also frequently used in the conservative magazine National Review. William F. Buckley, Jr. would warn of the machinations of the Homintern on his TV talk show Firing Line – feeding the conservative belief that the Homintern deliberately manipulated culture to encourage homosexuality by promoting camp programs such as the popular 1960s TV series Batman. Such magazine articles were often illustrated with the color lavender and the Homintern was sometimes called the "lavender conspiracy". It was subsequently claimed that there was a secret worldwide network of gay art gallery owners, ballet directors, movie producers, record label executives and photographers who, behind the scenes, determined who would become successful artists, dancers, actors, and models.

The historian Michael S. Sherry has used the term hominterm discourse "for the untidy bundle of ideas and accusations about the gay creative presence".

"Gaystapo" 
The term "Gaystapo" was coined in France in the 1940s by political satirist Jean Galtier-Boissière for the Vichy education minister, Abel Bonnard. It was subsequently applied by National Front leader Jean-Marie Le Pen to Florian Philippot, whom he accused of being a bad influence on Marine Le Pen.

"Gay mafia" 
The English critic Kenneth Tynan wrote to A.C. Spectorsky (editor of Playboy) in 1967 proposing an article on the "Homosexual Mafia" in the arts. Spectorsky declined, although he stated that "culture hounds were paying homage to faggotismo as they have never done before". Playboy would subsequently run a panel on gay issues in April 1971.

"Gay mafia" became more widely used in the US media in the 1980s and 1990s, such as the American daily New York Post. The term was also used by the British tabloid The Sun in 1998 in response to what it claimed was sinister dominance by gay men in the Labour Party Cabinet.

"Lavender mafia" 
While the term "Lavender Mafia" has occasionally been used to refer to informal networks of gay executives in the US entertainment industry, more generally it refers to Church politics. For example, a faction within the leadership and clergy of the Roman Catholic Church that allegedly advocates the acceptance of homosexuality within the Church and its teachings.

"Gay lobby" 

The term "homo lobby" or "gay lobby" is often used by opponents of LGBT rights in Europe. 
For example, the Swedish neo-Nazi party Nordic Resistance Movement runs a "crush the homo lobby" campaign. 
According to the German newspaper Der Tagesspiegel, advocating for LGBT rights could accurately be called lobbying, but the term  ('gay lobby') is insulting because it is used to suggest a powerful conspiracy which does not actually exist.

In Catholicism 
In 2013, Pope Francis spoke about a "gay lobby" within the Vatican, and promised to see what could be done. In July 2013, Francis went on to draw a distinction between the problem of lobbying and the sexual orientation of people: "If a person is gay and seeks God and has good will, who am I to judge?" "The problem", he said, "is not having this orientation. We must be brothers. The problem is lobbying by this orientation, or lobbies of greedy people, political lobbies, Masonic lobbies, so many lobbies. This is the worse problem."

Anti-transgender rhetoric

Misgendering 

Misgendering is the act of labelling others with a gender that does not match their gender identity. Misgendering can be deliberate or accidental. It can involve using pronouns to describe someone that are not the ones they use, calling a person "ma'am" or "sir" in contradiction to the person's gender identity, and using a pre-transition name for someone instead of a post-transition one (deadnaming).

Deception and masquerade 

Some terms often considered to be anti-trans such as shemale, trap, and ladyboy are perceived to promote the belief that trans women are men masquerading as women. The concept of a person whose gender identity differs from their assigned birth sex has often been twisted into jokes about how repulsive such a person must be.

Bathroom predators 

In response to a growing push for anti-discrimination bills regarding public restrooms, Former Arkansas Gov. Mike Huckabee delivered this message to a National Religious Broadcasters Convention during his 2016 bid for the presidency:Huckabee's joke prompted backlash from LGBT leaders, including Rebecca Issacs, the executive director of Equality Federation, who said in an email to The Huffington Post: "Everyone needs to use the restroom and everyone cares about safety and privacy. Despite recent gains in visibility, transgender people continue to face extraordinarily high rates of discrimination and violence."

In 2015, conservative group Campaign for Houston released an advertisement targeting Houston Proposition 1, an anti-discriminatory bill that would protect transgender peoples' rights to use bathrooms that align with their gender identity. The video, which implies the sexual assault of a young girl, was decried as "the definition of transphobia" by J. Brian Lowder, an associate editor for Slate and author for its LGBTQ section.

In feminism 

Some positions within feminist theory have used denialist rhetoric viewed as transphobic. Those that hold these positions are known as trans-exclusionary radical feminists, or "TERF" for short. This term was coined by feminist blogger Viv Smythe in 2008 as a value-neutral descriptor of feminists that engage in denialism.

In 1979, American radical feminist Janice Raymond published  The Transsexual Empire: The Making of the She-Male. In it, she wrote that,  "All transsexuals rape women's bodies by reducing the real female form to an artifact, appropriating this body for themselves." A common position in radical feminism maintain that trans women are not women in a literal sense and should not be in women-only spaces.

Some second-wave feminists perceive trans men and women respectively as "traitors" and "infiltrators" to womanhood. In a 1997 article British lesbian feminist Sheila Jeffreys wrote that  should be seen as a violation of human rights." Jeffreys also argued that by transitioning medically and socially, trans women are "constructing a conservative fantasy of what women should be. They are inventing an essence of womanhood which is deeply insulting and restrictive." In the late 2010s, this rhetoric evolved into the claim that transgender women force themselves on cisgender lesbians by using accusations of transphobia as a guilt trip.

Legality and censorship
Hate speech against LGBT people, or incitement to hatred against them, is criminalized in some countries.

See also

 Biphobia
 "Drop the T"
 Homophobic propaganda
 Lavender scare
 Lesbophobia
 LGBT stereotypes
 List of organizations designated by the Southern Poverty Law Center as anti-LGBT hate groups
 Religion and homosexuality
 Societal attitudes toward homosexuality
 Transmisogyny

Notes

References

Further reading

Anti-LGBT sentiment
Defamation
Framing (social sciences)
Hate speech
LGBT and society
Majority–minority relations
Persecution of LGBT people
Political communication
Populism
Rhetoric
Social conservatism
Homophobia